These are the official results of the men's 100 metres event at the 1996 Summer Olympics in Atlanta. There were a total number of 106 participating athletes from 75 nations, with twelve heats in round 1, five quarterfinals, two semifinals and a final. Each nation was limited to 3 athletes per rules in force since the 1930 Olympic Congress. The event was won by Donovan Bailey of Canada, the nation's first title in the event since Percy Williams won it in 1928.

Summary

Canada's Donovan Bailey won the gold medal, breaking the world record that Leroy Burrell of the United States had set in 1994. Namibia's Frankie Fredericks won the silver medal for a second consecutive Olympics, while Trinidad and Tobago sprinter Ato Boldon won the bronze. It was Trinidad and Tobago's first medal in the event since 1976. For Fredericks and Boldon, this was the first of two events where they both medaled behind a world record setting run; Fredericks took silver and Boldon bronze in the 200 metre event where Michael Johnson ran 19.32 to win.

At first Bailey who was going to be the eventual winner did not get a great start. Mitchell and Boldon got terrific starts. Boldon led the race till the 60 metre mark, the point where Canadian Donovan Bailey  was gaining on the field. He had an unbelievable surge with a top end speed of over 12 m/s, world record at that time. He won the race with a new 100 metres men's world record time of 9.84 which was 100th of a second faster than the previous record. Fredericks of Namibia edged past Boldon of Trinidad to take silver. While Linford Christie the defending Olympic Champion was watching the entire event unfold from the point of view of a spectator, having been disqualified after two false starts, the second of which was controversial.

This marked the first time since 1976 (and the boycotted 1980 Games) that no American runner medaled in the 100 metres, with 1992 bronze medalist Dennis Mitchell placing fourth behind Boldon. Counting 1980, it was only the fourth time that the United States missed the podium.

Background

This was the twenty-third time the event was held, having appeared at every Olympics since the first in 1896. For the first time, all three medalists from the previous Games (Great Britain's Linford Christie, Namibia's Frankie Fredericks, and the United States's Dennis Mitchell) returned. Indeed, seven of the eight finalists from 1992 were back in 1996—the other returners were Canadian Bruny Surin, Nigerians Olapade Adeniken and Davidson Ezinwa, and Jamaican Raymond Stewart; only Leroy Burrell did not return to the 100 metres in 1996. Donovan Bailey of Canada had won the 1995 world championships, followed by countryman Surin and then Trinidad and Tobago's Ato Boldon. Christie was the reigning Commonwealth and European champion, and had won the 1993 world championship.

Azerbaijan, Comoros, Guinea-Bissau, Kazakhstan, Kyrgyzstan, Libya, Saint Kitts and Nevis, Saint Vincent and the Grenadines, São Tomé and Príncipe, Ukraine, and Uzbekistan appeared in the event for the first time. Russia appeared independently for the first time since 1912 and Latvia did so for the first time since 1924. The United States made its 22nd appearance in the event, most of any country, having missed only the boycotted 1980 Games.

Competition format

The event retained the same basic four round format introduced in 1920: heats, quarterfinals, semifinals, and a final. The "fastest loser" system, introduced in 1968, was used again to ensure that the quarterfinals and subsequent rounds had exactly 8 runners per heat; this time, the system was used in both the heats and quarterfinals.

The first round consisted of 12 heats, each with 9 athletes scheduled (2 heats had 8 actually run due to withdrawals). The top three runners in each heat advanced, along with the next four fastest runners overall. This made 40 quarterfinalists, who were divided into 5 heats of 8 runners. The top four runners in each quarterfinal advanced, with one "fastest loser" place. The 16 semifinalists competed in two heats of 8, with the top four in each semifinal advancing to the eight-man final.

Records

These were the standing world and Olympic records (in seconds) prior to the 1996 Summer Olympics.

Donovan Bailey's 9.84 seconds in the final broke both the world and Olympic records.

Schedule
All times are Eastern Daylight Time (UTC-4)

Results

Round 1

Heat 1

Wells had one false start (a second would have resulted in disqualification).

Heat 2

Heat 3

Markoullides had one false start (a second would have resulted in disqualification).

Heat 4

Heat 5

Borrega had one false start (a second would have resulted in disqualification).

Heat 6

Heat 7

Heat 8

Silva had one false start (a second would have resulted in disqualification).

Heat 9

Douhou had one false start (a second would have resulted in disqualification).

Heat 10

Heat 11

Karlsson had one false start (a second would have resulted in disqualification).

Heat 12

Quarterfinals

Quarterfinal 1

Quarterfinal 2

Quarterfinal 3

Quarterfinal 4

Quarterfinal 5

Semifinals

Semifinal 1

Bailey had one false start (a second would have resulted in disqualification).

Semifinal 2

Final

The final was held on July 27, 1996. Christie was disqualified after two false starts. Boldon also had one false start.

References

 Official Report

100 metres
100 metres at the Olympics
Men's events at the 1996 Summer Olympics